Herry Kiswanto (born 25 April 1955) is an Indonesian football manager and former player, who played as a libero.

He is a former member of the Indonesia national team. On 3 April 2007 he received an Indonesian legendary player award. He is known for his sportsmanship, as he only received one yellow card during his 17 years senior career.

Early life 
Herry was born in Banda Aceh, Aceh from a Sundanese descendant. Later, his parents took him back to their family homeland in Ciamis, West Java. He took elementary and high school education there, he also start to play football. He joined the club Tornado and PTPN XIII as a youth player. Afterward he moved to study in Bandung, where he played for the club UNI while attending college.

Club career 
Kiswanto start his senior career in 1979, when he join Pardedetex Medan after the club owner TD Pardede saw him play. He initially played as a midfielder, but following a suggestion from his coach, Kamaruddin Panggabean, he began playing as a libero, a position he played in for both club and country.

After 4 years, he moved to Yanita Utama, where he spent for 2 years before moving Krama Yudha Tiga Berlian in 1985. He had success with both Yanita Utama and Krama Yudha Tiga Berlian success, as a champion of Galatama (highest level football league in Indonesia at that era) in 1983–1987 era. He helped his club to be champion of Galatama for 4 consecutive years. He stayed with Krama Yudha Tiga Berlian until 1991.

Later he moved to Assyabaab Salim Grup, before signing with Bandung Raya in 1993. He retired as a player after leading Bandung Raya to be a champion in Liga Indonesia Premier Division, during the 1995–1996 season under the manager Henk Wullems.

He is famous in Indonesian football for receiving only one yellow card during his 17-year career. His only booking came in a match for Krama Yudha Tiga Berlian against home side Pelita Jaya at Lebak Bulus Stadium, Jakarta, after protesting (in his role as a captain) about a refereeing decision. Kiswanto later said about that moment, "I always try not to get yellow card, but I got one, and I regret for that, at that time I ask to the referee about his decision, but he give me a yellow card instead of explanation".

International career 
According to the RSSSF, his international debut was on 30 May 1981. He earn 40 caps and scored 3 goals.

He was a part of the Indonesia team that won a bronze medal at the 1981 Southeast Asian Games, and 1989 Southeast Asian Games. He was also a silver medalist at the 1983 Southeast Asian Games, and was a gold medalist at the 1987 Southeast Asian Games.

He helped Indonesia win Group B during 1986 FIFA World Cup qualification, where they lost to South Korea in the next round. Also in 1986, he is a squad of Indonesia as 1986 Asian Games semifinalist. His last international match was on 19 June 1993.

Managerial career 
Kiswanto started his career as a coach in 1997 when Henk Wullems asked him to be an assistant coach for the Indonesian national side. He stayed at that position until 2000. He was manager of PSBL Lampung in 2000–2001, and assistant manager of Persija Jakarta in 2002–2004. After that he was a manager of PSIS Semarang and Persikabo Bogor, both for only one year.

His success as a manager started at Persmin Minahasa, when he led the club to 8th place in Liga Indonesia Premier Division season 2007–2008, and successfully promoted to Indonesia Super League in the season 2008–2009. But the club did not play in Indonesia Super League as they failed to meet verification criteria by Football Association of Indonesia.

Subsequently, he was contracted by his hometown club Persiraja Banda Aceh as a manager for the Liga Indonesia Premier Division season 2008–2009. But, following funding issues, he decided to resign after the end of half season competition. From Banda Aceh, he move to Soreang and directly tied a contract for the club Persikab Bandung.

For the 2010/2011 season, he returned to Persiraja Banda Aceh, where he led the club to become champions of 2010–2011 Liga Indonesia Premier Division. Persiraja then promoted to Indonesia Super League, but following internal conflict in Football Association of Indonesia, which resulted in dual competition, the club choose to play in Indonesia Premier League. Towards the start of season 2011/2012 there was a rumour that Herry will move to Persib Bandung, but he explained that he will stay at Persiraja Banda Aceh.

In November 2014, he was punished by PT Liga for his involvement in the match fixing case between PSIS Semarang and the team he managed PSS Sleman. He got a lifetime ban from participating in national football activities in Indonesia and a Rp. 200 million fine.

Legendary award 
In April 2007 along with 21 other players, he received an Indonesia legendary player award, from the Football Association of Indonesia. This award was granted to the players who promote Indonesian football in the international arena.

Personal life 
Herry is the oldest children of three, his sister is Herryana Kusumawati and his brother is Tony Hidayat. His parents are Qomari and Siti Salamah. Kiswanto is married to Tuty Heriyati and they have two children, Dony Prakasa Utama and Tania Natasya Berlian.

He is known as a sporting and calm player, both within and outside the pitch. Before playing as a professional footballer, he was a bank employee. He said that he "take it easy with the government promise to give him a home as a reward for gold medal in 1987 Southeast Asian Games, which is never happen". Also, he feels sincere with only Rp 100000 or ($11) each month as his pension reward for national team player from the government. Now besides football manager, he's running a land transfer and house rent business.

Honours

Club
Yanita Utama
 Galatama: 1983–1984, 1984

Krama Yudha Tiga Berlian
 Galatama: 1985, 1986–1987

Bandung Raya
 Liga Indonesia Premier Division: 1995–96

International
 Southeast Asian Games  Gold medal: 1987

References

External links 
 Persiraja website

1955 births
Living people
People from Banda Aceh
Sundanese people
Association football sweepers
Indonesia international footballers
Indonesian footballers
Indonesian football managers
Southeast Asian Games bronze medalists for Indonesia
Southeast Asian Games gold medalists for Indonesia
Southeast Asian Games medalists in football
Competitors at the 1981 Southeast Asian Games
Competitors at the 1983 Southeast Asian Games
Competitors at the 1987 Southeast Asian Games
Competitors at the 1989 Southeast Asian Games
Sportspeople from Aceh